Sacred Heart College, Marist Observatory is a private Catholic school in Observatory, Johannesburg founded in 1889 by the Marist Brothers. The college, originally established as the first Catholic school for boys in Johannesburg, accepts girls and boys through creche, pre-primary school, primary school and high school. It is distinguished among independent schools for its contribution to fostering an inclusive society in Apartheid-Era South Africa. The college runs an IEB examination course and is affiliated with the Independent Schools Association of Southern Africa.

History

France 
The Marist Brother movement started in France. From 1817 onwards a priest Marcellin Champagnat ran a primary school in the village of La Valla, France. Supported by seven brothers, Champagnat educated children in the fundamentals of reading, writing and Christian teaching.

Koch Street 
In 1889, Sacred Heart College was founded by three Marist brothers, who arrived in Johannesburg upon the Gold Rush in the neighbouring Witwatersrand. The first school for boys was established in Koch Street, where in 2 years enrolment had increased to 300 students.

Observatory 
In 1924, Additional grounds were later constructed in Observatory as a result of the school's rapid expansion.

Marist Brothers College 
The Marist Brothers College high-school (as it was then called) opened in 1926. Eventually, the school grew, requiring a second primary school building in the Orchards of the Observatory location.

Integration of Ethnic/Religious groups 
As many Jewish children attended the school in the 1950s, the College organised for a Rabbi to give lessons every Friday. By this time many Chinese students were also being admitted to the school, despite the growing racial tensions in the country at the time.

Koch Street Closure 
The Koch street premises had become overgrown with commercial properties during the 60s. As a result, it was closed down. During this transitionary period the school was headed by Br. Neil McGurk. His vision for education in South Africa ultimately led the college to ignore government order and open its doors to boys of all races.

Sacred Heart College, Marist Observatory 
In the 1980s, the school name reverted to Sacred Heart College. Along with this change came the introduction of girls in 1979 as a result of the amalgamation between Yeoville Holy Family Convent and St Angela's Ursuline School. The College transformed from an all-boys, all-white school to a multi-racial, co-educational institution over 2 years.

Apartheid - Era 
Amidst rising political tensions in the country, leaders of the ongoing political struggle approached the college with the task of educating hundreds of young children from townships. The College welcomed this challenge fully despite the obstacles they would face with conservative families in the school.

Academics 
The college has maintained a 100% pass rate in the national IEB examinations for the past 20 years and a 98% Bachelor's degree pass. Students continue to study and complete degrees of choice.

Houses 
Students at the College compete with one another in their respective houses. The four main houses are:

 Benedict (Green), named after the school's founder St. Marcellin Benedict Champagnat
 Geddes (Blue), named after Br. Joe Geddes 
 O'Leary (Yellow), named after Bishop David O'Leary 
 Valerian (Red), named after Br. Valerian (a former principal of the school and beloved teacher)

Uniform

School Blazer 
The Sacred Heart blazer is an important element of the school's history, culture and image. Its design is the standard for Marist schools in South Africa.

Colours Blazer 
The highest honour of distinction the college can offer to a student is a full-colour blazer. This is awarded to students who have met specific criteria in several disciplines e.g. Academics, Sports, the Performing Arts, Music, Cultural activities (Chess) etc.

Its current design is that of a navy-blue College blazer with optional white braiding.

Student Leadership 
Sacred Heart College has maintained an active Student Representative Council since 1989 — when the previous prefect system was replaced by a less authoritative and more representative leadership structure. Today the college's Learner Leadership Council (LLC) consists of matric students who are active members of the school and the greater community at large. In addition, the High School has confirmed with the SRC structure, which works with the LLC to give students an active role in school life. The Primary School also has leadership opportunities for grade 6s.

Sporting 
As of 2020, the following sporting codes are offered at Sacred Heart College:

Term 1 

 Tennis
 Swimming
 Cricket

Term 2 

 Soccer
 Netball
 Athletics
 Hockey
 Softball

Term 3 

 Basketball
 Tennis
 Athletics
 Cricket
 Swimming

Cultural Programs 
The school's extensive cultural program as of 2020 is as follows:

 Dance
 Art
 Chess
 Choir
 Coding
 Gaming
 Game Design
 Mad Youth
 Debating
 Enviro-Club
 Photography
 First Aid
 Marimbas
 Marketing Club
 Mosaic
 Mandarin
 Yoga
Tai Chi

Three-2-Six Project 
Founded in 2008 by former Head of College Colin Northmore, the Three-2-Six project is an educational initiative that provides refugee and asylum-seeking children with a hot meal and 3 hours of education daily.

The project has grown to include support from other schools in the surrounding Johannesburg East area.

It currently caters for more than 300 children.

Facilities 
The college is equipped with the following facilities:

 Chapel
 Prayer room
 Hall
 2 libraries
 2 AV rooms
 3 Computer labs
 Design and Technology Centre
 Music centre
 2 tuck-shops
 5 soccer fields
 4 netball courts
 6 tennis courts
 Heated swimming pool
 3 cricket ovals
 2 outside basketball courts
 6 cricket nets
 Indoor sports centre
 Fully equipped Gymnasium

Notable alumni 
 David Balchin, Bio-chemist, Postdoctoral fellow (Max Planck Institute of Biochemistry), Group Lead at Francis Crick Institute
 John Charles Daly, radio and television personality
 Hlomla Dandala, actor
 Katlego Danke, actress
 Dr. Nicole De Wet, senior lecturer at the University of the Witwatersrand
 Ruli Diseko, CEO of Thakadu Group
 Lord Joffe OBE, lawyer, Labour Peer of the House of Lords 
 Samuel Kinkead DSO DSC, WW1 fighter ace
 Ndaba Mandela, author, mentor, entrepreneur 
Lebogang Mashile, actress, Writer and performance poet
 Dr Ridwan Mia, plastic surgeon, led skin-graft operations on Isabella "Pippie" Kruger, awarded National Order of the Baobab
 Wandile Molebatsi, actor and producer 
 Dr. Maria Phalime, Award-winning author, Speaker
 Jonathan Pienaar, actor and voiceover artist
 Simphiwe Tshabalala, CEO of Standard Bank Group

References

Catholic secondary schools in South Africa
Schools in Johannesburg
Private schools in Gauteng
Educational institutions established in 1889
1889 establishments in the South African Republic